The Elimination Chamber is a professional wrestling elimination-based match held in the WWE. The match was created by Triple H, and introduced by Eric Bischoff in November 2002. It features a large chain-linked circular steel structure which encloses the ring. The chamber's floor is platformed over the ringside area which elevates it to ring level. Within the chamber are four inner enclosures outside each ring corner. While similar in profile and nature to WWE's original large scale steel-structured match Hell in a Cell, the Elimination Chamber match is a multiple participant match wherein two participants begin the match in the ring as the remaining four are held within each inner enclosure and are released into the match at five-minute intervals (in the event of a seven-person Chamber match, three participants begin, and in the event of a tag team Chamber match, two teams begin for a total of four participants starting). The objective is to eliminate each opponent from the match via pinfall or submission. The winner is the last remaining participant (or team) after all others have been eliminated. As in the Hell in a Cell match, disqualifications do not apply. Before the establishment of the yearly Elimination Chamber pay-per-view (PPV) in 2010, the match was contested at other PPV events. There have been 32 Elimination Chamber matches in WWE since the concept's inception in November 2002.

History

Origin 
Before the introduction of the Elimination Chamber match, WWE only promoted two matches in a caged environment, namely the steel cage and Hell in a Cell matches. The steel cage was the first type of cage-based match in professional wrestling and consisted of four fenced walls of steel surrounding the ring apron while the Hell in a Cell was a taller roofed version that surrounded the ring and ringside area on the ground rather than the apron. In 2002, WWE announced the creation of the Elimination Chamber, a match that combined elements of WWE's Hell in a Cell matches, Royal Rumble match, Survivor Series matches, and World Championship Wrestling's (WCW) WarGames matches, such as the countdown timer and time intervals from the Royal Rumble and War Games matches, the large enclosed cage format of both Hell in a Cell and WarGames and the elimination process from the Survivor Series contest and the Royal Rumble.

Brand and pay-per-view designation 

To exploit additional on-screen talent after buying World Championship Wrestling (WCW) in March 2001, the following year WWE began a brand extension that divided the roster between the two brands of WWE, namely Raw and SmackDown. Former WCW President and then Raw General Manager Eric Bischoff formally announced the creation of the chamber during the October 21 episode of Raw and scheduled the match to feature participants from the Raw brand roster at the Survivor Series in November 2002. The match was exclusive to the Raw brand for the first four matches and at joint-branded pay-per-view events, but upon the creation of the ECW brand in 2006 the match was instead promoted for the newly created brand at December to Dismember. Beginning in 2008, the match became exclusive to the No Way Out event and two Elimination Chamber matches were featured annually for two years among the three brands. In 2010, WWE replaced their No Way Out event with the self-titled Elimination Chamber, a new event which continued the tradition of its predecessor. From 2008 to 2014, the match had been featured in February events only. An Elimination Chamber event took place on May 31, 2015 exclusively on the WWE Network. After the second brand extension in 2016, it was announced that the brands would return to having separate events. In late 2016, it was announced that Elimination Chamber would return as a SmackDown-exclusive event in February 2017, but it switched to being Raw-exclusive in February 2018, which was the last brand-exclusive Elimination Chamber event, as following WrestleMania 34 that year, brand-exclusive pay-per-views were discontinued.

Injuries 

Triple H suffered an injury during the 2002 Survivor Series match with swelling on the inside of his throat which put pressure on his esophagus and trachea. This was caused after Rob Van Dam performed the Five Star Frog Splash off the top of one of the chambers. Triple H also expressed concern that he might have broken his wrist and noted anything could have caused it. Sheamus reportedly suffered a concussion during the Raw Elimination Chamber match in 2010. Also in 2010, The Undertaker was involved in a pyrotechnics accident during his ring entrance. He was temporarily engulfed in flames on three occasions when the pyrotechnics were mistimed and his jacket briefly caught on fire. He suffered first and second-degree burns to his neck and chest and according to a WWE spokesperson the injury "looked like a bad sunburn". He was only allowed to participate in the match after being cleared by a ringside doctor and was given bottles of water throughout the match to douse himself with to alleviate the discomfort. Acknowledging the concern, WWE now had padded the steel floor of chamber.

Match

Rules 
The Elimination Chamber match is a variation of elimination-based matches which draws elements from steel cage and Hell in a Cell matches in that the wrestling ring is surrounded by a large steel-fenced cage supported by girders. Originally, its design was a circular-like chain-linked structure, but since 2017 it is now square and encloses the ring. Its floor is platformed over the ringside area around the ring which elevates and levels it with the ring mat. Within the Elimination Chamber, four enclosures, referred to as inner chambers or pods, are encased in plexiglass and face the outside of each ring post. The match is contested by six or seven participants: two or three starting in the ring, while the other four are held within each inner chamber. The Elimination Chamber in February 2018 featured a seven-man chamber match in which three participants began. At regular intervals, one of the four participants within an inner chamber enters the match. This continues until all four have been released.  The entrance intervals are typically five minutes, though four and three minute gaps have also been used.

The objective of the match is to eliminate each opponent from the match by scoring a pinfall or a submission. These can occur in the ring or on the chamber's elevated floor, but starting with the 2010 event all pinfalls and submissions must take place within the ring. Disqualifications and count-outs do not apply in the process of elimination. The winner of the match is the last remaining participant after all others have been eliminated (or after all members of the opposing tag team are eliminated in either the tag team matches or the twelve-on-twelve tornado tag team elimination matches). The same rules apply when the match involves six tag teams, where two teams start in the ring and a new team leaves the pod and enters the ring at regular intervals.

Structure 

According to a WWE Magazine article in 2009 by WWE's production designer Jason Robinson, who co-designed the structure, several designs for the Elimination Chamber were considered. The structure was manufactured in Colorado Springs, Colorado and took six to eight weeks to make from design blueprints. It cost US$ 250,000 to construct.

The structure is made of black-painted steel with an outer structure of 16 frames, each weighing . Each inner chamber consists of three large steel framed sheets of plexiglass, costing US$225 per sheet.

A  flatbed truck is needed to transport the chamber. Assembly in the arena takes eight hours to complete and eight motors are used to suspend the structure over the ring before each event. When not in use, the structure is stored at a dock in Newark, New Jersey. Unlike standard steel cage matches and Hell in a Cell matches, Elimination Chamber matches cannot be held at several arenas due to the structure's massive size and weight, similar to how WarGames matches could only be held at certain arenas. This would play a factor in WWE dropping the annual Elimination Chamber event.

In 2017, the Elimination Chamber event returned (2017's event was SmackDown-exclusive while 2018's was Raw-exclusive). In addition, the chamber structure was redesigned, becoming square instead of circular. The pods were also changed from circular to square and feature sliding doors that referees slide open from outside the chamber. The steel grates between the ring and the cage were also replaced with padding. LED lights also line the corners of the structure. The redesign was for practical purposes due to certain venues only being able to house the previous structure, allowing most venues to host the Chamber.

Variations 
The fifth match, held by the ECW brand at December to Dismember, was a slight variation called the Extreme Elimination Chamber. In this variation, each chamber had one of four weapons for the competitors locked inside to hold on to. When each competitor's chamber opened, their weapon entered the match with them. The four weapons used in the match were a crowbar, a table, a steel folding chair and a barbed wire-wrapped baseball bat.

The 2015 Elimination Chamber event saw another slight variation of the match, namely the tag team chamber match. Both team members were inside of their respective pods, for a total of six tag teams in the match. Two teams, totaling four individual participants, started the match. This match was for the WWE Tag Team Championship. This variation was repeated in 2019, but for women and to determine the inaugural holders of the WWE Women's Tag Team Championship. Another tag team chamber match happened in 2020 for the WWE SmackDown Tag Team Championship.

The 2018 Elimination Chamber featured the first seven-man chamber match. Due to the extra person, three competitors started the match instead of two. The 2018 event also featured the first women's chamber match, but there were no variations in the rules.

Interference 
Despite the structure, interference has become common inside the Elimination Chamber. At New Year's Revolution in January 2005, Ric Flair distracted guest referee Shawn Michaels allowing Batista (who had been eliminated) to attack Randy Orton so Triple H could win the match. At No Way Out in February 2009, Edge attacked Kofi Kingston during his entrance and locked himself in one of the pods becoming a participant in the match for the World Heavyweight Championship after losing the WWE Championship earlier in the night. At Elimination Chamber in February 2010, Cody Rhodes passed Ted DiBiase Jr. a metal pipe which he used to eliminate Randy Orton in the match for the WWE Championship. Later in the night, Shawn Michaels broke into the chamber to cost The Undertaker his World Heavyweight Championship to Chris Jericho. At the Elimination Chamber event in February 2013, Mark Henry took out the remaining participants in the chamber for a World Heavyweight Championship match at WrestleMania 29 after being eliminated until SmackDown General Manager Booker T broke it up. At the Elimination Chamber for the WWE World Heavyweight Championship in February 2014, The Wyatt Family interfered by attacking John Cena, leading to his eventual elimination  by Randy Orton. Kane would then come out to help escort The Wyatt Family out of the chamber, but would then interfere to cost Daniel Bryan the match to Orton.

Match history 
The Elimination Chamber debuted at WWE's event Survivor Series at Madison Square Garden in November 2002. Since the inaugural match, there have been 31 other matches (32 overall) as of Elimination Chamber in February 2023. The Raw brand has been featured the most with 17 matches, including two joint-branded matches with SmackDown. ECW has been featured in two matches, including its joint-branded match with SmackDown. The SmackDown brand has been featured in ten matches, including the joint-branded matches with both ECW and Raw. The Elimination Chamber event has featured more Elimination Chamber matches than any other WWE pay-per-view event, with 23 matches being held. Triple H has the most victories with four. Chris Jericho and Randy Orton hold the distinctions of being involved in the most Elimination Chamber matches to date (8) and Jericho has eliminated the most wrestlers (10). Braun Strowman and Shayna Baszler have the most eliminations in a single Elimination Chamber match (5); Baszler is also the only winner to eliminate all other opponents in a single match.

The majority of matches have been contested for a top-tier championship with the WWE Championship (once as the WWE World Heavyweight Championship) being contested for the most in eight matches. The World Heavyweight Championship has the second-most at seven matches, while the ECW World Championship, WWE Tag Team Championship, SmackDown Tag Team Championship, Intercontinental Championship, Raw Women's Championship, and United States Championship being contested in one match each. Eight matches (two in 2008 and one in 2011, 2013, 2018, 2020, 2022, and 2023) awarded the winners the number-one contendership for the WWE Championship, World Heavyweight Championship, WWE Universal Championship, and Raw Women's Championship, respectively, at those years' WrestleMania; in 2021, SmackDown's Chamber match awarded the winner the number-one contendership for the Universal Championship that same night, which happened immediately after the Chamber match itself. The Elimination Chamber match has been contested only in indoor arenas in the United States and once each in Puerto Rico, Saudi Arabia, and Canada. From 2008 to 2014, the match had been featured in February pay-per-view events only. An Elimination Chamber pay-per-view event took place on May 31, 2015 exclusively on the WWE Network. The Elimination Chamber in February 2018 featured the first seven-man Elimination Chamber match as well as the first Elimination Chamber match for women with the Raw Women's Championship contested. The Elimination Chamber in February 2019 featured a tag team Elimination Chamber match, the second overall tag team chamber match, but this time for women to determine the inaugural holders of the WWE Women's Tag Team Championship.

Participant list

Males

Females

Compilation release 
In July 2010, WWE released Satan's Prison: The Anthology of the Elimination Chamber, a DVD featuring every Elimination Chamber match as of the 2010 Elimination Chamber. The European release of the DVD is titled Iron Will, primarily over the name change of the structure, match type and pay-per-view in Germany to avoid a brand blunder with the Elimination Chamber name as it may create imagery of gas chambers during The Holocaust (the Elimination Chamber pay-per-view, structure and match are called No Escape in Germany).

See also 
 Hell in a Cell
 Steel cage
 WWE Elimination Chamber

Notations

Notes

References

External links 
 WWE.com – Elimination Chamber match description
 Elimination Chamber Statistics

WWE match types
WWE Elimination Chamber

de:Wrestling-Matcharten#Elimination Chamber
it:Tipi di match di wrestling#Elimination Chamber Match